The Chemung District School No. 10 is a one-room schoolhouse located in Lowman, New York.  It was listed on the National Register of Historic Places on May 21, 2008.

Gallery

References

School buildings on the National Register of Historic Places in New York (state)
Colonial Revival architecture in New York (state)
School buildings completed in 1898
Buildings and structures in Chemung County, New York
National Register of Historic Places in Chemung County, New York